The 1971–72 Cypriot First Division was the 33rd season of the Cypriot top-level football league.

Overview
It was contested by 12 teams, and AC Omonia won the championship.  Olympiakos Nicosia participated in the Greek championship as the previous year's champions. They finished in 18th position.

League standings

Results

References
Cyprus - List of final tables (RSSSF)

Cypriot First Division seasons
Cypriot First Division, 1971-72
1